Saint-Félix-de-Reillac-et-Mortemart (Languedocien: Sent Feliç de Relhac e Mòrtamar) is a commune in the Dordogne department in Nouvelle-Aquitaine in southwestern France.

It results from the merger of the communes of Saint-Félix-de-Reillac and Mortemart, in 1827.

Population

See also
Communes of the Dordogne department

References

Communes of Dordogne